The Volkswagen ID.2all is an electric concept car first shown publicly on March 15, 2023. It previews a production version to be launched on the European market in 2025.

Volkswagen has confirmed that a sport version of the ID.2all is already in development.

Overview

References

External links
 Official website

Volkswagen vehicles
Volkswagen concept vehicles
Electric concept cars